The 2009–10 Michigan State Spartans men's basketball team represented Michigan State University in the 2009–10 NCAA Division I men's basketball season. Their head coach was Tom Izzo who was in his 15th year. The Spartans played their home games at the Breslin Center in East Lansing, Michigan and were members of the Big Ten Conference. MSU finished the season 28–9, 14–4 in Big Ten play to earn a share of the Big Ten regular season championship for the 12th time in school history. They lost to Minnesota in the quarterfinals of the Big Ten tournament. The Spartans received an at-large bid to the NCAA tournament as a No. 5 seed, their 13th consecutive trip to the NCAA Tournament under Izzo. They defeated New Mexico State, Maryland, Northern Iowa, and Tennessee to advance to the Final Four. In the Final Four, the Spartans' sixth trip to the Final Four under Izzo, they lost to Butler.

Previous season 
The Spartans finished the 2008–09 season 31–7, 15–3 in Big Ten play to win the Big Ten regular season championship. Michigan State received a No. 2 seed in the NCAA tournament, their 12th straight trip to the Tournament, and advanced to the National Championship game, their second trip to the title game under Tom Izzo, before losing to North Carolina.

Offseason 
The Spartans lost Goran Suton (10.4 points and 8.4 rebounds per game) to the NBA draft following the season.

2009 recruiting class

Season summary 
Michigan State was led by junior Kalin Lucas (14.8 points and 4 assists per game), senior Raymar Morgan (11.3 points and 6.2 rebounds per game), and sophomore Draymond Green (9.9 points, 7.7 rebounds, and 3 assists per game). The Spartans began the season ranked No. 2 in the polls following their trip to the National Championship game in 2009. MSU competed in the Legends Classic and were upset by Florida in the semifinals. In the third place game, the Spartans routed UMass. MSU fell to again to No. 10 North Carolina in the ACC–Big Ten Challenge in a rematch of the prior year's National Championship game. The Spartans finished the non-conference schedule at 10–3, also losing at No. 2 Texas. The Spartans were ranked No. 11 in the country entering the Big Ten regular season.

The Spartans began the Big Ten season on fire, winning their first nine games, with wins over No. 25 Northwestern and No. 17 Wisconsin in the first two games. The winning streak ended with three straight losses to Wisconsin, Illinois, and No. 6 Purdue. The Spartans rebounded to finish 14–4 in Big Ten play and capture a share of the Big Ten regular season title. Michigan State completed the regular season at 24–7 and ranked 11th in the country. As the No. 3 seed in the Big Ten tournament, they were defeated in overtime by No. 6 seed Minnesota in the quarterfinals.

The Spartans received an at-large bid to the NCAA Tournament, their 13th straight appearance, earning a No. 5 seed in the Midwest Region. Lucas scored a career high 25 points to pull off a controversial win against New Mexico State in the First Round. In the Second Round, Lucas went down with a serious knee injury and the Spartans needed a three-point shot from Korie Lucious at the buzzer to advance past Maryland. Without Lucas for the remainder of the Tournament, MSU beat Northern Iowa and Tennessee to advance to their second consecutive Final Four and sixth in the last twelve years. In the National Semifinal, they were defeated by National Runner-Up, Butler.

Roster

Schedule and results

|-
!colspan=9 style=| Non-conference regular season

|-
!colspan=9 style=|Big Ten regular season

|-
!colspan=9 style=|Big Ten tournament

|- 
!colspan=9 style=|NCAA tournament

Player statistics 

Source

Rankings

*AP does not release post-NCAA tournament rankings

Awards and honors

Draymond Green 
 Big Ten Sixth Man of the Year
 All Big Ten Third Team

Kalin Lucas 
 All Big Ten First Team
 NABC All District First Team
 USWBA All-District Team

Raymar Morgan 
 All Big Ten Third Team (Coaches)
 All Big Ten Honorable Mention (Media)

Durrell Summers 
 Most Outstanding Player, NCAA Tournament, Midwest Region

References

Michigan State Spartans men's basketball seasons
Michigan State Spartans
Michigan State
NCAA Division I men's basketball tournament Final Four seasons
2009 in sports in Michigan
2010 in sports in Michigan